Kelloggsville Public Schools is a school district located in Grand Rapids, Michigan, Wyoming, Michigan, and Kentwood, Michigan. The district serves 2,289 students 

It has two high schools, one middle school, three elementary schools, and an early child development center.

The high schools are Kelloggsville High School and Discovery High School.
Kelloggsville's Middle School is Kelloggsville Middle School.
The Elementary Schools Are West Kelloggsville, East Kelloggsville, and Southeast Kelloggsville.
Formerly an elementary school, Northwest Kelloggsville is now the Kelloggsville Early Childhood Learning Center

For sports, they participate in the Ottawa-Kent Conference Silver Division.  The sports teams play under the name Rockets.

Kelloggsville High School

Kelloggsville High School is a public high school located in Wyoming, Michigan, on 4787 Division Ave. SW.
It is part of the Kelloggsville Public Schools district. Its principal is James Alston. Its feeder school is the middle school.

It has an alternative high school called 54th Street Academy.

Athletics
Under Athletic Director, Daniel Russell, the Kelloggsville Rockets offers many sports, including boys' basketball (varsity, JV, and freshmen), tennis (varsity and JV), cross country (varsity), bowling (varsity), wrestling (varsity and JV), baseball (varsity and JV), softball (varsity), football (varsity and JV), cheerleading (varsity), soccer (varsity and JV), and track (varsity and JV). Their recent titles include a Division 3 Girls' Bowling State Championship (2007), Division 3 Boys' Track and Field State Champions (2013), 2007 and 2016 District Title for Wrestling, and won the Girls' Cross Country State Champions in 2000. They were also OK Silver Conference Champions in Cheerleading for three consecutive years from 2013-2016.

Organizations
Kelloggsville High School offers other opportunities including marching band, symphonic band, choir, jazz band, and theater.

Kelloggsville Middle School
This is the middle school in the Kelloggsville Public Schools school district. It is in the city of Kentwood at 4650 S. Division SE, Grand Rapids, MI, 49548. It was built in 1994. It houses grades 6 through 8 and is fed by the elementary schools. There are currently 462 students.

54th Street Academy

54th Street Academy is an alternative public high school located in Wyoming, Michigan. 
It is part of the Kelloggsville Public Schools district.

It is the alternative high school of Kelloggsville High School. The principal is Mr. Jeremy Palmitier. The school serves 9th–12th grade students.
It is also known to house the most students with Special Needs of Kelloggsville.

Elementary schools

West Kelloggsville is in the city of Wyoming, MI on 4555 Magnolia SW. It teaches grades Kindergarten through 3rd grade. It has 343 students.

East Kelloggsville is in the city of Kentwood, MI on 4656 Jefferson SE. It teaches grades Kindergarten through 3rd grade. It has 343 students.

Southeast Elementary is in the city of Kentwood, MI on 240 52nd SE. In its parking lot is the Administration Building. The school teaches grades 4th and 5th. It has 313 students.

Kelloggsville Early Childhood Learning Center
This is located in the former Northwest Kelloggsville elementary building. They offer 3 year old preschool and 4/5 year old Preschool. They also offer daily childcare.

References

External links
 Kelloggsville Webpage
 Kelloggsville on GreatSchools.org
  Kelloggsville Early Childhood Center Webpage

School districts in Michigan
Education in Kent County, Michigan
1856 establishments in Michigan